Several Zimbabwean sign languages developed independently among deaf students in different Zimbabwean schools for the deaf starting in the 1940s. It is not clear how many languages they are, as little research has been done; Masvingo School Sign is known to be different from that of other schools, but each school apparently has a separate sign language, and these are different from the community language or languages used outside of the schools. "Sign language", without further clarification, became one of Zimbabwe's official national languages with the Constitution of 2013.

References

Sign language isolates
Languages of Zimbabwe